John Maffey or Massey (fl. 1414) of New Romney, Kent, was an English Member of Parliament for New Romney in November 1414.

References

14th-century births
15th-century deaths
15th-century English people
People from New Romney
English MPs November 1414